Arland is both a given name and a surname. Notable people with the name include:

 Arland Bruce III (born 1977), footballer
 Arland D. Williams Jr. (1935–1982), air crash victim
 Arland F. Christ-Janer (1922–2008), president of Boston University
 Arland Thompson (born 1957), footballer
 Arland Thornton, sociologist
 Arland Ussher (1899–1980), academic
 Burleigh Arland Grimes (1893–1985), baseball player
 Giacomo Antonio Arland (c. 1668–1743), painter
 Marcel Arland (1899–1986), novelist